is a railway station in Chūō-ku, Sapporo, Hokkaido, Japan. It is served by Hakodate Main Line and other lines of Hokkaido Railway Company (JR Hokkaido), and is also connected to the Subway Sapporo Station.

Sapporo Station is the starting point and terminus for most limited express services operated by JR Hokkaido. It also has the tallest building (JR Tower) in Hokkaido. Sapporo station is developing into a commercial center as large as Ōdōri Park and Susukino.

Lines and trains
The following JR Hokkaido lines and trains pass through or terminate at Sapporo Station:

 Hakodate Main Line
Okhotsk limited express (Sapporo – )
Sōya limited express (Sapporo – )
Kamui limited express (Sapporo – )
Lilac limited express (Sapporo – )
Ishikari Liner semi-rapid ( – Sapporo – )
Niseko Liner rapid ( – Sapporo)

Hokuto limited express (Hakodate – Sapporo)
Ōzora limited express (Sapporo – Kushiro)
Tokachi limited express (Sapporo – )
Suzuran limited express ( – Sapporo)
Airport rapid ( – Sapporo – Otaru)
Airport special rapid ( – Sapporo)
 (Gakuen Toshi Line)

Layout
Sapporo Station consists of five platforms that are raised above street level. These raised platforms serve 10 tracks which run in an east–west direction. Two concourses run north–south below the platforms. It has a commercial facility called Paseo under the ground and JR Tower on the south side of the station. The station is also planned to become a new high-rise building and a terminal station of the Hokkaido Shinkansen that is scheduled to open in Fiscal Year 2030.

On 16 October, 2022, due to construction of the Hokkaido Shinkansen extension to Sapporo, Platform 11 opened for passengers while Platform 1 was discontinued. The new platform can accommodate trains up to six cars long.

Platforms

Adjacent stations

History

Sapporo Station opened on 28 November 1880 as a terminus of the Horonai Railway. A new station building was built in 1881 and it was enlarged as Sapporo developed. In 1908, the station building was rebuilt because of a fire in 1907. The restored building can be found in the Historical Village of Hokkaido in Nopporo Forest Park.

The third reconstruction was finished in 1951 and the Sapporo Subway was opened in 1971. An underground shopping center was started in 1972 and a commercial building was opened on the east side of the station in 1978.

With the privatization of JNR on 1 April 1987, the station came under the control of JR Hokkaido.

The current building was built in 2003.

Overnight sleeping car trains Cassiopeia, Hokutosei, and Hamanasu served the station prior to their discontinuation.

Surrounding area

  Subway Sapporo Station
 Sapporo station Bus Terminal
  (to Hakodate)
 Hokkaido Development Bureau building
 Hokkaido University
 Hokkaido Police Headquarters
 Sapporo Central Post Office
 Sapporo 1 building, (Sapporo Government Office building)
 Sapporo agricultural cooperative association (JA Sapporo), Chuo branch
 Sapporo JR Tower
 Sapporo Stellar Place, shopping mall
 Daimaru store, Sapporo branch
 Sapporo Cinema Frontier
 Sapporo Esta, shopping center
 Tokyu Department Store, Sapporo branch
 Asty 45, building
 PASEO, shopping center
 APIA, shopping center
 Hotel New Otani Sapporo

Sapporo station bus terminal

Highway buses 
 Iwamizawa; For Iwamizawa Station
 Mikasa; For Iwamizawa Station and Mikasa
 Bibai; For Bibai Station
 Furano; For Iwamizawa, Sunagawa, Higashi-Takikawa Station, Akabira Station, Ashibetsu Station, and Furano Station
 Kuriyama; For Kurisawa Station and Kuriyama Station
 Yubari; For Kuriyama Station, Shikanotani Station, and Yūbari Station
 Takikawa; For Takikawa Station
 Shintotsukawa; For Takikawa and Shintotsukawa
 Rumoi; For Takikawa, Fukagawa, and Rumoi Station
 Asahikawa; For Asahikawa Station
 Engaru; For Shirataki and Engaru Station
 Nayoro; For Wassamu Station, Kenbuchi, Shibetsu, Fūren Station, and Nayoro Station
 Ryuhyo Monbetsu; For Takinoue and Monbetsu
 Haboro; For Mashike Station, Rumoi Station, Obira, Tomamae, Haboro, Shosanbetsu, Enbetsu, Teshio, and Toyotomi Station
 Muroran/Muroran Soccer/Hakucho; For Noboribetsu Station, Higashi-Muroran Station, and Muroran Station
 Tomakomai/Haskap; For Tomakomai Station and Tomakoma Ferry Terminal
 Hakodate; For Yakumo, Mori, Nanai Station, Goryōkaku Station, Hakodate Station, and Yunokawa Onsen
 Pegasus; For Mukawa, Tomikawa Station, Kiyohata Station, Shizunai Station, Hidaka-mitsuishi Station, and Urakawa Station
 Hidaka; For Mukawa, Tomikawa Station, Biratori, and Hidaka
 Date Liner; For Datemombetsu Station
 Otaru; For Otaru-Chikkō Station, Otaru Station
 Yoichi; For Ranshima Station, Yoichi Station, Umekawa, and Toyohama
 Shakotan; For Ranshima Station, Yoichi, Furubira, and Shakotan
 Iwanai; For Rashima, Yoichi, Kyōwa, and Iwanai
 Niseko; For Otaru Station, Yoichi, Niki, Kyowa, Kutchan, and Niseko
 Hiroo Santa; For Urakawa and Hiroo
 Erimo; For Hidaka-horobetsu Station, Samani Station, and Erimo
 Starlight Kushiro; For Shiranuka Station, Otanoshike Station, and Kushiro Station

See also
Sapporo Station (Sapporo Municipal Subway)
List of railway stations in Japan

References

External links

 JR Sapporo Station Map

Railway stations in Sapporo
Chūō-ku, Sapporo
Railway stations in Japan opened in 1880
Hokkaido Shinkansen